Allan G. Johnson (1946–2017) was an American writer and public speaker who worked in the fields of sociology and gender studies. One of his nonfiction works is The Gender Knot: Unraveling our Patriarchal Legacy, about the detrimental effects of the patriarchy. He died of lymphoma.

Biography
Allan G. Johnson was born in Washington, DC. He lived there until he was six years old, when he and his family moved to Oslo, Norway, for two years while his father served at the U.S. Embassy. When the family returned to the United States, they settled in Massachusetts.

Johnson earned his bachelor's degree in Sociology and English at Dartmouth College and his PH.D. in Sociology at the University of Michigan. His dissertation focused on women's roles in Mexico City. After receiving his PhD, he worked at Wesleyan University in the sociology department. During this time, he published his first book, Social Statistics without Tears. After he left Wesleyan, he worked at Hartford College for Women, teaching sociology and women's studies. During this time, he wrote a number of books, including The Gender Knot and The Forest and the Trees: Sociology as Life, Practice, and Promise.

In 1995, Johnson began working as a corporate trainer and began doing freelance public speaking engagements after The Gender Knot was published. During this time, he began to publish novels, including The First Thing And The Last and Nothing Left to Lose.

Bibliography
Social Statistics without Tears (1977)
Human arrangements: An introduction to sociology, 4th edition 1996)
The forest for the trees: An introduction to sociological thinking (1997)
The Gender Knot: Unraveling our Patriarchal Legacy, 3rd edition (2014)
Privilege, Power, and Difference, 3rd edition (2017)
The Blackwell Dictionary Of Sociology: A User's Guide To Sociological Language, 2nd Edition (2005)
Nothing Left to Lose (2012)
The First Thing and the Last (2010)
The Forest and the Trees: Sociology as Life, Practice, and Promise, 3rd edition (2014)
Not from Here: A Memoir (2015)

References

20th-century American writers
21st-century American writers
Gender studies academics
People from Washington, D.C.
Wesleyan University faculty
Dartmouth College alumni
University of Michigan alumni
American sociologists
1946 births
2017 deaths